WZLD (106.3 FM, "Wild 106.3") is a mainstream urban music formatted radio station licensed to Hattiesburg, Mississippi, serving the Laurel-Hattiesburg Arbitron market.

External links

ZLD
Mainstream urban radio stations in the United States
IHeartMedia radio stations